Otto of Carinthia may refer to:
Otto I, Duke of Carinthia
Otto III, Duke of Carinthia